Burroughs Abbott (9 October 1830 – 6 December 1905) was an American politician who served in the Minnesota House of Representatives and the South Dakota Senate.

Abbott was born in Indiana on October 9, 1830. There, he married Angeline Ruggles, and worked as a farmer and teacher, before moving his family to Minnesota in 1856. He was elected to the state's House of Representatives, serving the sixteenth district from 1859 to 1860. Abbott moved to South Dakota in 1883, and between 1891 and 1892 was a state senator from Brown County, district 33. Though state records in Minnesota and South Dakota do not list a party affiliation for Abbott, George Washington Kingsbury writes that Abbot began his political career as a Republican and later joined the Populist Party. He died on December 6, 1905.

References

External links

1830 births
1905 deaths
Republican Party members of the Minnesota House of Representatives
South Dakota state senators
South Dakota Populists
19th-century American politicians